Foxearth is a village and civil parish on the borders of north Essex and Suffolk in England, between Long Melford and Cavendish. The neighbouring parishes are Borley, Belchamp Walter, Belchamp Otten, Liston and Pentlow.

History
Foxearth is an ancient settlement in north Essex. The lands are very good loamy clay soil. Foxearth has always been predominantly agricultural, and had its own watermill that originally fell within a separate parish, Weston, until the year 1286, when the two manors became united.

In the reign of Edward the Confessor, the parish was in the possession of nineteen sochmen and four freemen; The Domesday survey shows that the small manor of Foxearth Hall, had become the property of Richard Fitz-Gilbert, ancestor of the lords of Clare.

Literally "fox’s den",
the village is recorded as Focsearde in the Domesday Book (1086) and mediaeval spellings varied somewhat — Foxherde (1202), and Foxherthe (1232), Foxhierd (1221 & 1428), Foxhole  (1212 and 1314), Foxhierd (1246), also Foxhirde (1246), Foxerht (1261), Foxeyerde (1294), Foxherne (1362), Foxhorn (1363), Foxzerd (1428) and finally Foxearth (1594).

Until the mid-nineteenth century, Foxearth was a typical agricultural village. The village was transformed by wealthy vicar, Rev. John Foster. In order to loosen the grip of the farmers on the community, Foster funded a brewery in the village in 1878 to provide alternative employment. The brewery was run by three generations of the Ward family. Under the Wards' influence, the village was rebuilt in red brick, with flint walls, with the brewery providing employment. It was one of the pioneers in the production of bottled beers and also produced several non-alcoholic bottled drinks. Although the brewery was bought back in a reverse takeover bid in 1960, it was sold again by the Ward family in 1963 to Charrington United Breweries.
The brewery site was sold in 1988 with the final demolition of the building  begun in the 1990s. It is now a housing estate.

St. Peter and St. Paul's church

The parish church of St. Peter and St. Paul's stands on the east side of the village. The walls are of flint rubble with stone dressings, and the roofs with tile and lead. The church has a tower, nave, with a north aisle, and formerly a south aisle, and a chancel; adjoining the north side of which is Kemp's Chapel, which belongs to the hall.

The whole building is of stone, and at the west end there is a square tower with eight bells (now dormant save the automatic clock chimes) and which formerly had a spire. The nave is of uncertain date, but circa 1350 a north aisle was added and the chancel was rebuilt. The north aisle was rebuilt and widened around 1450, and Kemp's Chapel was added; the chancel arch was possibly removed at the same time. The west tower was added in 1862 by Rev John Foster, and the church was restored and the south porch added at around the same time.

In the north wall is a Victorian doorway, and further west a two-centred arch of c. 1450 and two hollow chamfered orders; the responds are moulded and shafted, with moulded bases and capitals. In the south wall are two windows; the eastern is of c.1350, partly restored and of two cinquefoiled lights with tracery in a segmental pointed head, under a chamfered label; the western window is Victorian, except the internal splays and hollow chamfered rear arch, which are of the 15th century. Between the windows is a Victorian doorway. There is no chancel arch, but between the chancel and the nave is a chamfered and moulded beam, probably of the 15th century.

Sources
 Foxearth Brew - Richard Morris (book covering the Brewery's existence)
 Complete text of Richard Morris's book. Foxearth Brew
 Large collection of photographs of Foxearth
 Local history site for Foxearth

References

External links

Villages in Essex
Braintree District